Swapna Waghmare Joshi (16 July 1966) is a well-known director and producer of TV Serials. She has also directed the Bollywood films. She is well known for her direction of Rang Badalti Odhani and Damadamm. She lastly worked in recently concluded show Sanskaar – Dharohar Apnon Ki which is aired in Colors at 9 pm.

Personal life

She was born in Vadodara in Gujarat.

Television

Filmography

Damadamm!
Mitwaa
Fugay
Lal ishq 
Savita Damodar paranjpe

References

External links

Indian television directors
1966 births
Living people
People from Vadodara